Mala Ravan (locally , sometimes also Mali Raven or Mala raven) is a former settlement in the Municipality of Kamnik in central Slovenia. It is now part of the village of Bela. The area is part of the traditional region of Upper Carniola. The municipality is now included in the Central Slovenia Statistical Region.

Geography
Mala Ravan lies in the southern part of Bela, in a small valley between Smolnik Hill to the north and Vrhe Hill to the south.

Name
Mala Ravan was attested as Klain eben in 1488. The common noun ravan 'flatland, plateau' is relatively common in Slovene toponyms.

History
Mala Ravan was annexed by Bela in 1952, ending its existence as a separate settlement.

Cultural heritage
There is a wayside shrine in Mala Ravan that is registered as cultural heritage. The shrine stands on the western edge of the settlement and dates from the twentieth century.

References

External links

Mala Ravan on Geopedia

Populated places in the Municipality of Kamnik
Former settlements in Slovenia